Vladimir Korsunov (born March 16, 1983) is a Russian former professional ice hockey defenceman. He last played for PSK Sakhalin in Asia League Ice Hockey. He played 185 games in the Russian Superleague for HC Spartak Moscow.

He was drafted 105th overall by the Mighty Ducks of Anaheim in the 2001 NHL Entry Draft.

Career statistics

Regular season and playoffs

International

External links

1983 births
Living people
Anaheim Ducks draft picks
Kazzinc-Torpedo players
HC Khimik Voskresensk players
HC Kuban players
Russian ice hockey defencemen
Rubin Tyumen players
HC Rys players
PSK Sakhalin players
HC Spartak Moscow players
HC Yugra players
People from Odintsovo
Sportspeople from Moscow Oblast